Byron is a census designated place (CDP) in Contra Costa County, California, United States.

History
Byron's location was part of a land grant that Jose Noriega received from the King of Spain in 1835. Noriega then sold 17,000 acres to John Marsh (pioneer) for the equivalent of $500 (three U.S. cents per acre). In 1841, the Bidwell-Bartelson wagon train arrived at Marsh's ranch with the earliest Anglo settlers from the east.

Byron's first post office opened in 1878. Byron is named after an employee of the San Pablo, and the eastern U. S. and Pacific Railroad.

In 1942, all of the town's residents of Japanese descent were forcibly removed by the US government with pressure from California agricultural interests and taken to Turlock assembly center.

In 1960, Contra Costa County built the Orin Allen Youth Rehabilitation Center, better known informally as the Boys' Ranch on a  tract immediately southeast of Byron. The Boys' Ranch is a minimum-security facility that houses up to 100 youthful offenders. The property has no security fence to contain residents within the perimeter and includes dormitories, classrooms, a kitchen and dining facility, athletic facilities and administrative offices which occupy about one-third of the area. Its objective was stated as rehabilitation, rather than simply detention.

In 2008, a Contra Costa County Grand Jury began an investigation into whether the facility was cost-effective, or whether it should be permanently closed. It began by conducting an unannounced site inspection in September, 2008. In 2009, it released its report to the county commissioners. The report identified 21 defects at the facility that needed correction.

Geography

Climate
This region experiences hot and dry summers, with average monthly high temperatures varying from 55 degrees in January to 93 degrees in July.   Byron is windy, and dust devils sometimes appear. According to the Köppen Climate Classification system, Byron has a warm-summer Mediterranean climate, abbreviated "Csb" on climate maps.

Gallery

Demographics

2010
At the 2010 census Byron had a population of 1,277. The racial makeup of Byron was 911 (71.3%) White, 61 (4.8%) African American, 11 (0.9%) Native American, 4 (0.3%) Asian, 11 (0.9%) Pacific Islander, 224 (17.5%) from other races, and 55 (4.3%) from two or more races. Hispanic or Latino of any race were 503 people (39.4%).

The census reported that 1,177 people (92.2% of the population) lived in households, no one lived in non-institutionalized group quarters and 100 (7.8%) were institutionalized.

There were 389 households, 171 (44.0%) had children under the age of 18 living in them, 229 (58.9%) were opposite-sex married couples living together, 37 (9.5%) had a female householder with no husband present, 27 (6.9%) had a male householder with no wife present.  There were 25 (6.4%) unmarried opposite-sex partnerships, and 3 (0.8%) same-sex married couples or partnerships. 76 households (19.5%) were one person and 25 (6.4%) had someone living alone who was 65 or older. The average household size was 3.03.  There were 293 families (75.3% of households); the average family size was 3.50.

The age distribution was 405 people (31.7%) under the age of 18, 136 people (10.6%) aged 18 to 24, 306 people (24.0%) aged 25 to 44, 312 people (24.4%) aged 45 to 64, and 118 people (9.2%) who were 65 or older.  The median age was 32.0 years. For every 100 females, there were 112.8 males.  For every 100 females age 18 and over, there were 106.6 males.

There were 415 housing units at an average density of ,of which 389 were occupied, 254 (65.3%) by the owners and 135 (34.7%) by renters. The homeowner vacancy rate was 3.0%; the rental vacancy rate was 3.6%. 759 people (59.4% of the population) lived in owner-occupied housing units and 418 people (32.7%) lived in rental housing units.

2000
At the 2000 census there were 916 people, 286 households, and 203 families in the CDP. The ethnic makeup of the CDP was 75.00% White, 4.37% Black or African American, 1.09% Native American, 2.18% Asian, 0.44% Pacific Islander, 14.74% from other races, and 2.18% from two or more races. 25.87% of the population were Hispanic or Latino of any race.

Of the 286 households 36.4% had children under the age of 18 living with them, 53.8% were married couples living together, 11.5% had a female householder with no husband present, and 28.7% were non-families. 22.0% of households were one person and 9.8% were one person aged 65 or older.  The average household size was 2.85 and the average family size was 3.36.

The age distribution was 35.0% under the age of 18, 9.1% from 18 to 24, 28.2% from 25 to 44, 18.8% from 45 to 64, and 9.0% 65 or older.  The median age was 31 years. For every 100 females, there were 129.0 males.  For every 100 females age 18 and over, there were 105.2 males.

The median household income was $35,938 and the median family income  was $44,306. Males had a median income of $42,639 versus $28,889 for females. The per capita income for the CDP was $21,231.  About 15.6% of families and 14.9% of the population were below the poverty line, including 33.3% of those under age 18 and none of those age 65 or over.

Byron Hot Springs

Byron, California is also home to the somewhat well-known and historical Byron Hot Springs, a now-abandoned resort that was a retreat that attracted many movie stars and famous athletes in the early 1900s. The first hotel was built around 57 hot springs and owned by Lewis Mead in 1889. The hotel included a three-story wood building, with a few cottages scattered nearby, as well as a laundry, gas plant and ice plant, all of which were destroyed by fire on July 25, 1901. A second hotel, also three stories, but made of stucco was constructed 1901–1902, but it burned on July 18, 1912. The third and final hotel, a four-story brick structure was built in 1913, reopened in 1914.

In 1938 the resort closed, after a series of lawsuits that were probably brought about by the Great Depression, but was leased by the government in 1941 and became a military interrogation camp housing both German and Japanese prisoners of war, known as Camp Tracy, until 1945, when orders were sent to dismantle it.

In 1947 Byron Hot Springs was put up for sale and purchased by the Greek Orthodox Church for $105,000. It served as Monastery St. Paul for several years. It then changed hands several times as a resort, country club, and private residence. In 2008, a developer announced plans to restore the resort.  a Byron Hot Springs website retains a "Resort Plans" page for the restoration of Byron Hot Springs.

In 2005, a Victorian-era carriage house on the property was burned to the ground. The hotel itself sustained some fire damage, but still stands.

The property has most recently attracted graffiti vandals, urban explorers, and photographers. The site has been used as the set of national Bay Area rap artist Mars for various projects including his Zodiac Tour commercial, and an interview with Insane Clown Posse on their Weekly Freakly Weekly internet news show. DJ Clay, who is also the DJ for Insane Clown Posse, shot parts of his music video for his single "Pen & Paper" here.

A post office operated at Byron Hot Springs from 1889 to 1930.

Transportation

Byron Airport
In 1993 Contra Costa County broke ground on a new airport two miles (3 km) south of Byron. On October 8, 1994, Byron Airport was dedicated. The new airport has  of land.  are reserved for habitat management land for the San Joaquin kit fox, a federally listed endangered species, as well as many other endangered and special status species.

This is the home airport of the Patriots Jet Team. It has also been used for illegal drag races in the past.

Bus
There is limited bus service to Byron by Tri-Delta Transit's route 386, which connects the community and Discovery Bay with the Brentwood Park and Ride Lot where passengers may transfer to buses connecting to other cities in the region.

Notes

References

External links 

Byron Hot Springs 
Reclamation District 800
Byron Hot Springs

Census-designated places in Contra Costa County, California
Census-designated places in California
Populated places established in 1878
1878 establishments in California